The 2000 Exxon Superflo 12 Hours of Sebring was the 48th running of the 12 Hours of Sebring as well as the opening round of the 2000 American Le Mans Series season.  It took place at Sebring International Raceway, Florida, on March 18, 2000. This was the first time ever the 12 Hours was covered flag-to-flag on television with Speedvision doing the honors.

Race results
Class winners in bold.

Statistics
 Pole Position LMP - Frank Biela #78 Audi Sport North America - 1:48.825
 Pole Position GTS - Ron Fellows #3 Corvette Racing - 1:59.646
 Pole Position GT  - Dirk Muller #5 Dick Barbour Racing - 2:07.064
 Fastest Lap - #78 Audi Sport North America - 1:50.287
 Distance - 2143.646 km
 Average Speed - 178.141 km/h

References
 
 

Sebring
12 Hours of Sebring
12 Hours of Sebring
12 Hours Of Sebring
12 Hours Of Sebring